The East Navidad River Bridge, also known as the State Highway 3 Bridge at East Navidad River, is a historic concrete bridge that carries FM 1579 across the East Navidad River about  east of Schulenberg in Fayette County, Texas. The  cantilever bridge has a  center span. Concrete piers and abutments support the two cantilever arms. The bridge gives the appearance of an arch but is in fact two cantilevered arms joined in the center of the main span and anchored and countered at the ends. Concrete piers with skewed abutments provide support.

It was a joint project of the state of Texas and Fayette county. Funding originated at the federal level with the Federal Aid Act of 1921 and continued with State Aid Project No. 256 A and county contributions. Completed in November 1922 it was designed by Armour Townsend Granger who is listed as designer on the name plates of the bridge, as engineer by the Texas Department of Highways but as draftsman in employment records. The State Bridge Engineer was George Wickline. Lake Robertson was hired to act as Resident Engineer.

Photo gallery

See also
List of bridges documented by the Historic American Engineering Record in Texas
National Register of Historic Places listings in Fayette County, Texas

References

External links

Buildings and structures completed in 1922
Historic American Engineering Record in Texas
National Register of Historic Places in Fayette County, Texas
Road bridges on the National Register of Historic Places in Texas